John William Dunscomb (February 23, 1804 – December 16, 1891) was a merchant and political figure in Canada East, Province of Canada (now Quebec). He represented Beauharnois in the Legislative Assembly of the Province of Canada from 1841 to 1842 as a Government supporter and supporter of the union of the two Canadas.

Dunscomb was born in 1804 in St. John's, Newfoundland, the son of John Dunscombe, but his business was based in Montreal, Lower Canada. He married Caroline Birch Dumford, with whom he had one daughter.

Dunscomb served on the municipal council for Montreal from 1840 to 1841, when he resigned from the council. 

Following the rebellion in Lower Canada, and the similar rebellion in 1837 in Upper Canada (now Ontario), the British government decided to merge the two provinces into a single province, as recommended by Lord Durham in the Durham Report.  The Union Act, 1840, passed by the British Parliament, abolished the two provinces and their separate parliaments, and created the Province of Canada, with a single parliament for the entire province, composed of an elected Legislative Assembly and an appointed Legislative Council.

Dunscombe stood for election in first general election in 1841, for the riding of Beauharnois, and awas elected to the Legislative Assembly of the new Parliament.  He was a Government supporter, who favoured the union of Lower Canada and Upper Canada into a single province. He generally supported the British governor.

On July 15, 1842, Dunscombe was appointed Warden of Trinity House in Montreal. He resigned his seat in the Assembly on October 8, 1842.

He later served as customs collector at Quebec City and as Customs Commissioner for the Province of Canada.  He was the author of Provincial Laws of the Customs and Canadian Custom House Guide, both published in 1844.

Dunscomb died in Quebec City at the age of 87.

Notes

References 

1804 births
1891 deaths
Members of the Legislative Assembly of the Province of Canada from Canada East
Anglophone Quebec people
Newfoundland Colony people